Finland competed at the 2012 Summer Olympics in London, from 27 July to 12 August 2012. The nation has competed at every Summer Olympic Games since its official debut in 1908. The Finnish Olympic Committee (SO) sent a total of 56 athletes to the Games, 29 men and 27 women, to compete in 14 sports. There was only a single competitor in artistic gymnastics, taekwondo, weightlifting and tennis.

Notable Finnish athletes included the defending champion Satu Mäkelä-Nummela in women's trap shooting, and Olympic bronze medalist Tero Pitkämäki in men's javelin throw. Badminton player Anu Nieminen, and swimmer Hanna-Maria Seppälä, who finished fourth in the women's freestyle event, made their fourth Olympic appearance as the most experienced athletes. Seppälä also became Finland's first female flag bearer at the Summer Olympics' opening ceremony (in the Winter Olympics, Marja-Liisa Kirvesniemi had carried the Finnish flag in 1994).

Suomen Olympiakomitea (SO) set a goal of three medals, with at least one gold medal and six point positions in eighth-place finish, to be targeted in the medal standings. At the end of the Games, Finland already had three medals, but reached beyond the medal target by a single point.

Finland, however, left London with two silvers and one bronze medal in sailing and athletics, failing to win a gold medal for the second time in Summer Olympic history since 2004. Antti Ruuskanen only received his silver medal in 2017, due to doping by the original silver medalist  Oleksandr Pyatnytsya from Ukraine.  Several Finnish athletes who reached finals missed out on the medal standings including Pitkämäki, and taekwondo jin Suvi Mikkonen.

Medalists

Athletics

Finnish athletes have so far achieved qualifying standards in the following athletics events (up to a maximum of 3 athletes in each event at the 'A' Standard, and 1 at the 'B' Standard):

Key
 Note – Ranks given for track events are within the athlete's heat only
 Q = Qualified for the next round
 q = Qualified for the next round as a fastest loser or, in field events, by position without achieving the qualifying target
 NR = National record
 N/A = Round not applicable for the event
 Bye = Athlete not required to compete in round

Men
Track & road events

Field events

Women
Track & road events

Field events

Badminton

Canoeing

Sprint

Qualification Legend: FA = Qualify to final (medal); FB = Qualify to final B (non-medal)

Cycling

Road

Equestrian

Dressage

Gymnastics

Artistic
Women

Judo

Sailing

Finland has qualified 1 boat for each of the following events

Men

Women

Match racing

Open

M = Medal race; EL = Eliminated – did not advance into the medal race;

Shooting

Finland has earned four quota places in shooting events;

Men

Women

Swimming

Finnish swimmers have so far achieved qualifying standards in the following events (up to a maximum of 2 swimmers in each event at the Olympic Qualifying Time (OQT), and 1 at the Olympic Selection Time (OST)):

Men

Women

Taekwondo

Finland has qualified 1 athlete.

Tennis

Weightlifting

Wrestling

Finland has qualified two quota places.

Key
  - Victory by Fall.
  - Decision by Points - the loser with technical points.
  - Decision by Points - the loser without technical points.

Men's Greco-Roman

References

Nations at the 2012 Summer Olympics
2012
2012 in Finnish sport